John O'Mahony (born 8 June 1953) is an Irish former Fine Gael politician and former football manager who served as a Senator from 2016 to 2020, after being nominated by the Taoiseach. He was a Teachta Dála (TD) for the Mayo constituency from 2007 to 2016.

Early and personal life
O'Mahony is a native of Kilmovee, County Mayo. He is a graduate of University College Galway. He taught for many years at St Nathy's College, Ballaghaderreen, County Roscommon.

O'Mahony is married to Gerardine Towey, they have five daughters.

Sports career
O'Mahony was manager of the Mayo Gaelic football team, and formerly led Galway to two All-Ireland Senior Football Championship victories in 1998 and 2001, and guided Leitrim to success in the 1994 Connacht Senior Football Championship. In 2009, he was named at 114 in the Sunday Tribune'''s list of the 125 Most Influential People In GAA History''.

Political career
O'Mahony was elected as a TD for the Mayo constituency at the 2007 general election. He lost his seat at the 2016 general election. In the 2016 general election, he stood in the Galway West constituency, due to the Mayo constituency being reduced from 5 to 4 seats, and Fine Gael having 4 outgoing TDs in the Mayo constituency.

In May 2016, he was nominated by the Taoiseach Enda Kenny to the 25th Seanad.

He was the Fine Gael Seanad spokesperson on Transport, Tourism and Sport.

References

  

1953 births
Living people
Alumni of the University of Galway
Alumni of St Patrick's College, Maynooth
Fine Gael senators
Fine Gael TDs
Gaelic football managers
Irish schoolteachers
Irish sportsperson-politicians
Members of the 30th Dáil
Members of the 31st Dáil
Members of the 25th Seanad
Nominated members of Seanad Éireann
Politicians from County Mayo
Sportspeople from County Mayo